Owen Marecic (born October 4, 1988) is a former American football fullback. He played at the collegiate level for Stanford University.

Early life
Marecic moved with his family around the United States following his father's career as an IT executive. After New Jersey and Boston, where he played Pop Warner for the Westford/Littleton Lions, the Marecics moved to the Los Angeles area, where Owen played quarterback for a Pop Warner football team in Agoura Hills coached by former NFL player Clay Matthews. One of his Pop Warner teammates was the coach's son, former Philadelphia Eagles linebacker Casey Matthews. The Marecics moved to Tigard, Oregon when Owen was a sophomore in high school where he enrolled at Jesuit High School. Marecic played fullback and linebacker for Jesuit, helping the team to Oregon state football titles his junior and senior years.

College career

Marecic was recruited to Army, Yale, and Stanford, eventually opting to attend Stanford.  In his first three seasons with the Cardinal, Marecic was used primarily as a fullback, blocking for Toby Gerhart.  He was an excellent blocking fullback, and seldom carried the ball. In his junior year Marecic was brought in as an inside linebacker in short yardage situations. In his senior season of 2010, Marecic's part-time linebacker assignment became full-time, a decision the coaching staff made reluctantly out of necessity. They later praised his conditioning for the challenge of participating in so many full-contact plays—including over 100 in a single game—through yoga, stretching, meditation before switching positions, and a thorough academic understanding of the difficulties as a human biology major. He was the only player in the Football Bowl Subdivision to start on both offense (at fullback) and defense (at inside linebacker). In the fourth game of the season against Notre Dame, Marecic scored a pair of touchdowns within 13 seconds of one another, first as a fullback on a short dive play,  then 13 seconds later making an interception from his inside linebacker position, running it back for a score.  In doing so he became the first player to score touchdowns on both offense and defense in the same game since Eric Weddle in 2006.

On January 10, 2011, he was named the inaugural winner of the Paul Hornung Award as the most versatile player in college football. Marecic also finished in 10th place for the 2010 Heisman Trophy, receiving 3 first place votes.

Professional career

2011 NFL Draft

On April 30, 2011 Marecic was selected in the 4th round by the Cleveland Browns with the 124th pick in the 2011 NFL Draft. This was one of four picks the Browns acquired by trading their own first round pick to the Atlanta Falcons; the Falcons drafted future pro-bowler Julio Jones, while the Browns drafted Phil Taylor (DT), Greg Little (WR), Marecic, and Brandon Weeden (QB) and have since been widely criticized. He was projected to play at fullback rather than linebacker.  The Browns were reportedly impressed with his work ethic and approach to the game.

Cleveland Browns
Marecic made the Browns roster, contributing in 2011 primarily as a blocking back for running backs Peyton Hillis and Montario Hardesty. He was cut by the Browns on August 27, 2013.

San Francisco 49ers
On September 17, 2013, the 49ers signed Marecic to a one-year contract. Marecic had played at Stanford under then-49ers coach Jim Harbaugh. He was released on October 1, 2013 without playing in an NFL game. According to the 49ers, Marecic decided not to continue playing in the NFL.

Post-football career

After leaving football, Marecic re-enrolled at San Francisco State University to finish pre-med requirements and worked at a medical research lab at Stanford, in preparation for medical school. As a researcher, he has contributed to two published articles in the Journal of Visualized Experiments. Marecic is currently a MD candidate at Stanford School of Medicine.

References

External links
Stanford Cardinal bio 

1988 births
Living people
People from Agoura Hills, California
People from Tigard, Oregon
Sportspeople from Los Angeles County, California
Sportspeople from the Portland metropolitan area
Players of American football from Oregon
American football linebackers
American football fullbacks
Jesuit High School (Beaverton, Oregon) alumni
Stanford Cardinal football players
Cleveland Browns players
San Francisco 49ers players
Players of American football from California